FAST Team may refer to:
Firefighter Assist and Search Team
Fleet Antiterrorism Security Team, an elite branch of the U.S. Marine Corps
Drug Enforcement Administration#Foreign-deployed Advisory and Support Teams